Edward Kargbo (born  January 24, 1963) is a politician in Sierra Leone. He ran for President in 1996 but lost with 2.1% of the national vote.

See also
Politics of Sierra Leone

References

20th-century Sierra Leonean politicians
1963 births
Living people
Place of birth missing (living people)